Emile Emanuel Anthony Linkers (born 25 September 1990) is a Dutch professional footballer who most recently played as a forward or winger for Tweede Divisie club FC Lienden. Born in Willemstad, Netherlands Antilles, he made one appearance for the Aruba national team in 2014.

International career
Linkers made his debut on 30 May 2014 in a 1–0 victory against Turks and Caicos for the Caribbean Cup. He made his first international goal in the match.

Career statistics
Scores and results list Aruba's goal tally first, score column indicates score after each Linkers goal.

References

External links
 Profile at ligaindonesia.co.id
 

1990 births
Living people
Dutch people of Aruban descent
Dutch people of Curaçao descent
People from Willemstad
Dutch footballers
Aruban footballers
Association football forwards
Aruba international footballers
Eredivisie players
Liga 1 (Indonesia) players
NAC Breda players
Indonesian Premier Division players
PSIM Yogyakarta players
PSIS Semarang players
Persepam Madura Utama players
FC Lienden players
Dutch expatriate footballers
Dutch expatriate sportspeople in Indonesia
Expatriate footballers in Indonesia